The Web is a series of 12 books for young adults, novellas about the Internet of the future, edited by Simon Spanton, written by English language science fiction and fantasy authors like Stephen Baxter, Stephen Bowkett, Eric Brown, Pat Cadigan, Maggie Furey, Peter F. Hamilton, Graham Joyce, James Lovegrove, and Ken MacLeod. 

Each book has a tagline (except Untouchable) which usually follows the lines of "Virtually ..., Really ..."

Books
Gulliverzone (1997) by Stephen Baxter, 
Dreamcastle (1997) by Stephen Bowkett, 
Untouchable (1997) by Eric Brown, 
Spiderbite (1997) by Graham Joyce, 
Lightstorm (1998) by Peter F. Hamilton,   
Sorceress (1998) by Maggie Furey, 
Webcrash (1998) by Steve Baxter, 
Cydonia (1998) by Ken Macleod, 
Computopia (1999) by James Lovegrove, 
Spindrift (1999) by Maggie Furey, 
Avatar (1999) by Pat Cadigan, 
Walkabout (1999) by Eric Brown, 
The Web 2027 (1999),  (omnibus: The Web Series 1–6)
The Web 2028 (1999),  (omnibus: The Web Series 7–12)

Book series introduced in 1997
Science fiction book series
Science fiction short stories
Novellas